The Pennsylvania State System of Higher Education (PASSHE) is a state agency of the Commonwealth of Pennsylvania that oversees 10 state-owned universities. Collectively, it is the largest provider of higher education in the commonwealth. All of the schools are primarily NCAA Division II members and affiliated with the Pennsylvania State Athletic Conference (PSAC).

PASSHE should not be confused with Pennsylvania's other state-funded university system, the Commonwealth System of Higher Education that includes the land grant university (Pennsylvania State University), three historically private universities (Temple University, Lincoln University, and University of Pittsburgh), and the related campuses of the four institutions.

History
The Normal School Act of 1857 was passed on the last day of session on May 20, 1857. Its passage created 12 normal school districts in the state in which to establish private corporations answerable to the State Superintendent of Common Schools. Afterward, the School Code of 1911 mandated that the Commonwealth purchase all the normal schools. The normal schools evolved from state normal schools, to state teacher's colleges, to state colleges. Act 188, which was signed into law on November 12, 1982, and came into effect on July 1, 1983, established the Pennsylvania State System of Higher Education, and converted those state colleges into universities.

2022 consolidations
A plan to merge six of the current PASSHE institutions into two multi-campus universities is ongoing as of July 2021. There was huge public outcry against the plan. As it faced opposition by the Lock Haven City Council, the Clinton County Commissioners, the Clear Coalition, the Party for Socialism and Liberation Chester County, PASSHE Defenders, AFSCME Council 13, Pennsylvania AFL–CIO, APSCUF and a slew of public comments. Groups like APSCUF, AFSCME, and the Pennsylvania AFL–CIO held a press conference May 3, 2021, to speak out in opposition to the consolidation. PASSHE Defenders & the Party for Socialism & Liberation Chester County held rallies across the state at the campuses slated for consolidation and at the state capital Harrisburg. The plan being a part of the larger state system redesign was shown to have disastrous effects according to a report out of the Political Economy Research Institute (PERI) of the University of Massachusetts Amherst. The report titled "The Economic Impact of the PASSHE Employment Reductions" outlines "[The] large cuts in staffing, both of faculty and of professional and classified staff in good unionized jobs, constitute the core of the restructuring. The cuts, amounting to 14 percent of overall PASSHE employment, are of a magnitude equivalent to the largest private-sector plant closings and mass layoffs of the previous decade in Pennsylvania."

Under the plan, two sets of three schools would merge into single institutions effective July 1, 2022—Bloomsburg, Lock Haven, and Mansfield in the state's northeast, and California, Clarion, and Edinboro in western Pennsylvania. Each three-school group will have a new name, but the plan calls for all institutions involved in these mergers to retain their current campus identities and athletic programs. The PASSHE board of governors approved the plan on April 28, 2021, which opened a 60-day public comment period.

The comment period originally was set to have two public comment hearings throughout the 60-day public comment period as outlined in Act 50, only taking place on June 9 and 10. However after public pressure the Board of Governors announced the addition of two additional hearings the same days. Additionally, APSCUF held their own public comment hearings.

The NCAA would have to approve the continued separation of the athletic programs at the merged institutions. The board voted unanimously to approve the merger on July 14, but a system press release stated that "the efforts to complete the two integrations will take years."

Funding
State higher education funding across the country has seen significant cuts. In particular Pennsylvania saw an almost 34% cut in state funding from 2008 to 2018. PASSHE over the past two decades has been cut harshly in regards to state funding. As the early 2000's they received over $700 million adjusted to 2022's dollars by the state. However the 2021–2022 academic year they received below $500 million.

Universities and related entities
The system is a composition of 10 universities in Pennsylvania:

Consolidations in 2022 
Starting in the 2022–2023 academic year, six of the PASSHE campuses were consolidated into two universities.
 Pennsylvania Western University, comprising the former California, Clarion, and Edinboro universities.
 Commonwealth University of Pennsylvania, comprising the former Lock Haven, Bloomsburg, and Mansfield universities. These three institutions, while merged operationally with a common leadership and administrative structure, retain their distinct names and logos and appear as three unrelated universities for branding purposes. However, the three universities were legally merged into a single university under the accreditation of Bloomsburg University, henceforth known as Commonwealth University of Pennsylvania by its accrediting body.

Centers
 Dixon University Center
 State System @ Center City

Related organizations
 Keystone Library Network
 Pennsylvania State Athletic Conference

State System universities also operate four branch campuses. The Office of the Chancellor was situated in the capital city of Harrisburg at the Dixon University Center.

As reported in November 2020, "The Pennsylvania State System of Higher Education was given the green light from the General Assembly to sell the Dixon University Center". The Dixon University Center was then purchased by the Jewish Federation of Greater Harrisburg.

Mission
As established by the founding legislation, Act 188 of 1982, the primary mission of the State System of Higher Education "is the provision of instruction for undergraduate and graduate students to and beyond the Master's degree in the liberal arts and sciences, and in the applied fields, including the teaching profession." Additionally, the purpose of the State System is "to provide high quality education at the lowest possible cost to students."

Governance
A 20-member Board of Governors oversees the system. Additional power is vested in the Councils of Trustees at the constituent universities.

Board of Governor's membership includes: four state legislators, three students, the Governor of the Commonwealth (or a designee), the Pennsylvania Secretary of Education (or a designee), and 11 citizens appointed by the governor and confirmed by the state senate.

The Board of Governors sets general policy for the State System. They also set recommendations regarding individual university tuition and the university technology fee. They have meetings typically on a quarterly basis.

Act 188 of 1982 states, "Funding for the Board of Governors and chancellor shall come from all operating funds available to the State colleges and State-owned university, but shall not exceed one-half of one per centum (.5%) of such funds. For purposes of this section, the phrase “operating funds” means any federal appropriation, any state appropriation, any student tuition fees and any student fees for room and board".

Additionally, Act 188 states "The Board of Governors shall provide for the holding of regular and special meetings. Eleven (11) governors
attending shall constitute a quorum for the transaction of any business and, unless a greater number is required by
the bylaws of the board, the act of a majority of the governors present at any meeting shall be deemed the act of the
board. ((b) amended June 23, 1988, P.L.457, No.77)".

Current enrollment and alumni
Almost 110,000 undergraduate and graduate, part-time and full-time, students attend State System universities. Nearly 90 percent are Pennsylvania residents and 80 percent remain in Pennsylvania after graduation. Minority enrollment is at an all-time high. A record total of 11,500 minority students—nearly 11 percent of the total student population—are taking classes at State System universities. There are more than 734,000 State System alumni, including more than 518,000 who live and work in Pennsylvania.

Facilities and employees
A total of 862 buildings with nearly  house classrooms, residences, administrative offices, and student support services. The State System employs more than 13,700 professional and support staff, most covered by collective bargaining agreements. The various libraries are connected through the cooperative Keystone Library Network.

See also

 List of Pennsylvania state agencies

References

External links
 

 
Public university systems in the United States